Ibabo is a river in central Bolivia. It joins the Ichilo River.

References 

Rivers of Santa Cruz Department (Bolivia)